Pentecost is a 2011 Irish comedic live action short film directed by Peter McDonald. The film was nominated for the 2012 Academy Award for Best Live Action Short Film.

The film follows an eleven-year-old boy who is a last-minute call-in by his local parish to serve as an altar boy at an important mass.

References

External links

Irish short films
2010s English-language films
Irish comedy films
Comedy short films